In enzymology, a 3alpha,7alpha,12alpha-trihydroxy-5beta-cholestanoyl-CoA 24-hydroxylase is an enzyme that catalyzes the chemical reaction

(25R)-3alpha,7alpha,12alpha-trihydroxy-5beta-cholestan-26-oyl-CoA + H2O + acceptor  (24R,25R)-3alpha,7alpha,12alpha,24-tetrahydroxy-5beta-cholestan-26- oyl-CoA + reduced acceptor

The 3 substrates of this enzyme are (25R)-3alpha,7alpha,12alpha-trihydroxy-5beta-cholestan-26-oyl-CoA, H2O, and acceptor, whereas its two products are (24R,25R)-3alpha,7alpha,12alpha,24-tetrahydroxy-5beta-cholestan-26-oyl-CoA, and reduced acceptor.

This enzyme belongs to the family of oxidoreductases, specifically those acting on CH or CH2 groups with other acceptors. The systematic name of this enzyme class is (25R)-3alpha,7alpha,12alpha-trihydroxy-5beta-cholestan-26-oyl-CoA:ac ceptor 24-oxidoreductase (24R-hydroxylating). Other names in common use include trihydroxycoprostanoyl-CoA oxidase, THC-CoA oxidase, THCA-CoA oxidase, 3alpha,7alpha,12alpha-trihydroxy-5beta-cholestanoyl-CoA oxidase, 3alpha,7alpha,12alpha-trihydroxy-5beta-cholestan-26-oate 24-hydroxylase. This enzyme participates in the ppar signaling pathway.

References

 
 
 
 
 

EC 1.17.99
Enzymes of unknown structure